The Poets' Fountain was a public fountain with sculptures that was installed on a traffic island in Park Lane, London, in 1875. It was removed in 1948 and it is thought to have been destroyed. One sculpture, an allegorical figure of Fame, is known to have survived and is displayed in the gardens at Renishaw Hall in Derbyshire.

The sculpture cost £5,000, the gift of Mrs Maria Mangini (sometime Mangin) Brown of Hertford Street, Mayfair. She was born in London in 1777, of Italian descent, and married Aquila Brown, a merchant from Baltimore, in 1792. Their daughter Harriet Mangin Brown married a Portuguese nobleman, the Comte d'Orta (later Viscount D'Alte), but died before her mother and was buried in Kensal Green Cemetery. Maria Mangini Brown died intestate in December 1871, aged 94, leaving an estate of over £250,000, but she had established a competition in 1871, shortly before her death, to design a sculpture to celebrate the glories of English poetry, to be installed near her house. The competition was won by the artist Thomas Thornycroft, and the sculpture was done by Thomas, assisted by his wife Mary Thornycroft and their son Hamo Thornycroft, with other members of the Thornycroft family as models.

The fountain included a basin, with seated bronze statues representing the muses of Comedy, Tragedy and History (respectively, Thalia, Melpomene and Clio). Above and between them were standing marble statues of Shakespeare (facing towards Hyde Park), Chaucer (facing towards Piccadilly) and Milton (facing down Park Lane). The statue of Shakespeare was between the figures of Tragedy and Comedy, Milton between Tragedy and History, and Chaucer between Comedy and History.

The structure was topped by a gilded statue above representing a winged Fame, holding a laurel and blowing a trumpet (also oriented to point towards Hyde Park). Thomas worked on Milton, and designed the bronze seated muse of Tragedy. The statues of Chaucer, the muse of Comedy and Fame were all done by Hamo. Hamo considered that the sculpture of Fame was his best public work.

The fountain was inaugurated on 9 July 1875, at the junction of Hamilton Place and (old) Park Lane. It suffered bomb damage during the Blitz and was removed in 1948, possibly as part of the proposals to widen Park Lane. Most parts are lost, believed to have been destroyed, but the statue of Fame was rescued by Osbert Sitwell. It is displayed in the garden at Renishaw Hall in Derbyshire, where it is known as the Angel of Fame; it was regilded in 2002.

References
 Edward Walford, 'Apsley House and Park Lane', in Old and New London: Volume 4 (London, 1878), pp. 359–375. British History Online [accessed 20 March 2018].
 The Invisible “Sculpteuse”: Sculptures by Women in the Nineteenth-century Urban Public Space—London, Paris, Brussels, Marjan Sterckx
 British Sculptors of the Twentieth Century, Alan Windsor
 Poets' Fountain, Exploring London
 Fountain (lost): Poets' Fountain – Chaucer, Shakespeare & Milton, London Remembers
 Details of work: Poets' fountain, A Biographical Dictionary of Sculptors in Britain, 1660–1851
 Details of Sculptor: Thomas Thornycroft, A Biographical Dictionary of Sculptors in Britain, 1660–1851
 Poets Fountain, Courtauld Institute of Art
 The Gardens at Renishaw, Derbyshire Life and Countryside, 25 July 2011

External links
 Garden Angel at Renishaw Hall, Getty Images
 Poets Fountain, Park Lane, Mayfair, Greater London, Historic England ViewFinder

Monuments and memorials in London
Outdoor sculptures in London
1875 sculptures
Fountains in the United Kingdom
Removed monuments and memorials
Geoffrey Chaucer
Memorials to William Shakespeare
John Milton